Tetraclita japonica, the Japanese volcano barnacle, Kurofujitsubo,  is a species of symmetrical sessile barnacle in the family Tetraclitidae.

Subspecies
These subspecies belong to the species Tetraclita japonica:
 Tetraclita japonica formosana (Hiro, 1939)
 Tetraclita japonica japonica (Pilsbry, 1916)

References

japonica
Crustaceans described in 1916